Cuango, also Cuango-Luzamba or Luzamba, is a town and  municipality in Lunda Norte Province in Angola. The municipality had a population of 183,767 in 2014. It is served by Luzamba Airport.

References

Populated places in Lunda Norte Province
Municipalities of Angola